Bárbara Leôncio (born October 7, 1991) is a young Brazilian athlete, world champion in the 200 meters at the 2007 World Youth Championships in Athletics held in Ostrava, Czech Republic. In the same edition, Bárbara was placed fourth in the 100 meters. In the following year, she placed 13th in the semifinals of the 100 meters at the 2008 World Junior Championships in Athletics, held in Bydgoszcz, Poland.

Achievements

Notes

External links
 

1991 births
Living people
Brazilian female sprinters
South American Games silver medalists for Brazil
South American Games bronze medalists for Brazil
South American Games medalists in athletics
Competitors at the 2010 South American Games
Athletes from Rio de Janeiro (city)
21st-century Brazilian women